The 2003–04 FIS Cross-Country World Cup was the 23rd official World Cup season in cross-country skiing for men and women. The season began in Düsseldorf, Germany on 25 October 2003 and finished in Pragelato, Italy on 14 March 2004. René Sommerfeldt of Germany won the overall men's cup, and Gabriella Paruzzi of Italy won the women's.

Calendar

Men

Women

Men's team

Women's team

Men's standings

Overall

Distance

Sprint

Women's standings

Overall

Distance

Sprint

Nations Cup

Overall

Men

Women

Achievements
Victories in this World Cup (all-time number of victories as of 2003–04 season in parentheses)

Men
 , 3 (8) first places
 , 2 (6) first places
 , 2 (5) first places
 , 2 (4) first places
 , 2 (4) first places
 , 2 (3) first places
 , 2 (3) first places
 , 2 (2) first places
 , 1 (3) first place
 , 1 (2) first place
 , 1 (2) first place
 , 1 (2) first place
 , 1 (2) first place
 , 1 (1) first place
 , 1 (1) first place
 , 1 (1) first place

Women
 , 7 (10) first places
 , 4 (13) first places
 , 4 (11) first places
 , 3 (4) first places
 , 2 (15) first places
 , 2 (2) first places
 , 1 (1) first place
 , 1 (1) first place
 , 1 (1) first place

Retirements

References

External links

FIS Cross-Country World Cup seasons
World Cup 2003-04
World Cup 2003-04